Surplus may refer to:

 Economic surplus, one of various supplementary values
 Excess supply, a situation in which the quantity of a good or service supplied is more than the quantity demanded, and the price is above the equilibrium level determined by supply and demand
 Surplus: Terrorized into Being Consumers, a documentary film
 Surplus value, surplus labour, surplus product in Marxian economics
 "The Surplus", a 2008 episode of The Office
 Surplus (graph theory)

See also 
 Thomas J. Surpless (1877–1911), New York politician
 
 Deficit (disambiguation)